The missile research and development program was the Pakistan Ministry of Defence secretive program for the comprehensive research and the development of guided missiles. Initiatives began in 1988 Benazir Bhutto Government in a direct response to equivalent program existed in India and was managed under the scrutiny of the Ministry of Defence in close coordination with the other related institutions.

The program focused towards developing the short to medium range missiles with a computer guidance system. The project started in 1988 and has since spawned several strategic missile systems capable of carrying both conventional and nonconventional payloads. In its early stage, the Hatf missiles were made feasible as well as developing the Ghauri missile program. Further development led to the introduction of ballistics and cruise missiles by different scientific organizations in the 2000s.

Program overview

Planning and initiatives for the program began in 1987 based on an intelligence estimates on the existence of the missile program of India, which was taking place under the Indian DRDO. Memoirs written by former chief of army staff General Mirza Beg, the eventual planning of the program began in 1987, with many of the organizations associated with the Ministry of Defence. The program was delegated to Space Research Commission, DESTO, KRL, and PAEC, all individually working on the program under the MoD and the MoDP.

President Zia-ul-Haq had held several national security meetings with the MoD and MoST officials to give crucial authorization for the launch of the program in 1987. The major motivation for this program, according to a military official, was to counter the India's ingeniously developed Prithvi system, first successfully tested in 1988. Only Hatf project was made it operational in 1987–88. Restriction and strict technology transfer monitored by the MTCL by the numbers of Western countries and the United States slowed the efforts for the program. In a direct technological race with India, the program was focused more towards ingenuity.

The program was aggressively pursued by Prime Minister Benazir Bhutto's government faced with the missile gap with India with apparent testing of Prithvi-I missile in 1990 and strongly advocated and lobbied for the program's feasibility in the 1990s. From 1993 to 1995, the program focused on developing the comprehensive short- to medium-range missiles systems to deter missile threat from India. The program picked up speed under the control of Prime Minister Benazir Bhutto, and its existence was kept under extreme secrecy. Crucial decisions were taken by Benazir government and technologies were developed under administration ultimately resulted in the successful development of both short– and medium-range systems.

Prime Minister Benazir Bhutto is described as a political "architect of Pakistan's missile technology" by Emily MacFarquhar of Alicia Patterson Foundation. At the leftist convention held in 2014, former Prime Minister Yousaf Raza Gillani said, "Benazir Bhutto gave this country the much-needed missile technology".

The program eventually expended and diversified with the successful development of the cruise missiles and other strategic level arsenals in the early 2000s.

Codenames
Secretive codenames for the projects of concerning national security had been issued since the 1970s, and the military continued to do so, to promote the secrecy around the missile programme. The missile systems in this program were all given codenames by their respective organizations. However, all missiles were issued single codename series: Hatf, for the surface to surface guided ballistic missiles. This codename was selected by the research and development committee at the GHQ of the Pakistan Army. In Arabic, hatf meaning "Target" refers to the sword of the Prophet Muhammad which was used in many of his military conquests, and had the unique distinction of never missing its target.

The other unofficial names, such as Ghauri and Abdali, are given the names of historical figures in the Islamic conquest of South Asia. Pakistan's missile systems are named after the powerful Turk warlords who invaded India from the historical region of Greater Khorasan;present day Afghanistan and western Pakistan between the 11th and 18th centuries in an attempt to expand their empires.

Battle-range system

The Hatf system (English tr.: "Vengeance") was the first project that was developed under this program in 1980s and the project went to the Pakistan Army. Designed by the SRC and developed by the KRL, the program was seen as to India's Prithvi, with three variants developed for the use by the Pakistan Army. Classified under the BRBM class, the missile has been in services with Pakistan Army since 1992.

The programme initially led by the SRC after developing the Hatf–IA, an improved version  with same payload. Its final evolution led to the development of the Hatf–IB which includes a proper computer inertial guidance system with an extended range. In 2011, the NDC developed the latest battle-field range system that seen as a compatible to Hatf–IV and widely believed to be a delivery system for small tactical nuclear weapons, which is codenamed as: Hatf–IX Nasr.

Short–medium range development

With the development of BRBM type missiles, the program extended towards the creation of the both short–to–intermediate range system. Originally, Prime Minister Benazir Bhutto was initially interested in seeking the procurement of Chinese M–11 missiles but cancelled the talks due to international pressure in the 1990s but China secretly transferred the equipments & technology for the same to Pakistan. After convincing arguments, the project went to SRC in 1995 and the development soon began. Codename Ghaznavi, it is the first solid–fuel based short range system with a range of 600km with a payload of 500kg. The Ghaznavi system was tested in 1997 and is stated to have been a major break-through. The Ghaznavi is a two-stage solid fuel based missile and an advanced terminal guidance system with an onboard computer. The DESTO designed five different types of warheads for the Ghaznavi can be delivered with a CEP of 0.1% at 600 km. It is believed that the design of the Ghaznavi is influenced from the Chinese M-11 missile, but the military officials have claimed that the Ghaznavi was developed entirely in Pakistan.

Under the same category of SRBM, the second project which was codename Shaheen, was widely pursued and developed by the National Defence Complex (NDC)– a spinoff of PAEC. The Shaheen is a series of solid-fuelled missiles and expended well to SRC, NESCOM, DESTO, and Margalla Electronics. Despite many technological set backs and learning from India's developmental experience of the Agni-II, the project continues to evolve and produced the Shaheen-I which entered in the service in 1999. The Shaheen project produces three variants that are considered to be in the MRBM range. The Shaheen-II has a range of 2,500 km with a capacity of carrying payload of 1050kg. Its third variant, the Shaheen-III, rumored to be underdeveloped and is an IRBM range. No official confirmation of the project is known but only the media reports. In January 2017, the Ababeel, a development of the Shaheen-III with multiple independently targetable reentry vehicles (MIRV), was tested. This is a Shaheen-III airframe with an enlarged payload fairing and slightly shorter range of 2,200 km. The intention of the MIRV system is to counteract Indian BMD.

While Shaheen was developed in 1995, another parallel project was being run under the KRL. Codename Ghauri, the project was aimed towards developing the liquid-fuel ballistic missile. The Ghauri was based on entirely on North Korea's Rodong-1 as its technology heavily reflected the Rodong-1. The project was supported by Benazir Bhutto who consulted for the project with North Korea and facilitated the technology transfer to KRL in 1993. According to the military officials, the original design was flawed and the missile burned up on re-entry during its first test flight. The KRL was forced to perform the heavy reverse engineering and had to redesign the entire missile. With scientific assistance from the DESTO, NDC, and the NESCOM, the first missile Ghauri–I was developed. It was successfully tested on 8 April 1998 and entered in the service. As Shaheen, the Ghauri evolves and produced Ghauri-II, also in the 1990s. The Ghauri-II has a maximum range of 2,000km (1,200mi) with a payload of 1,200kg.

Under the Ghauri, its third variant which was codenamed as Ghauri III was underdeveloped by KRL. The Ghauri III was cancelled in 2000 despite the project being completed its 50% of work.

Cruise systems
In 2005 the Hatf VII Babur ground-launched cruise missile was revealed in a public test-firing. Early versions had a range of 500 km but later a 700 km variant was tested. In September 2012 a new launch vehicle was tested, as well as a new command and control system named the Strategic Command and Control Support System. It was stated that the SCCSS would give "decision-makers at the National Command Centre robust command and control capability of all strategic assets with round the clock situational awareness in a digitised network-centric environment." It was also stated that the Babur's guidance system uses terrain contour matching (TERCOM) and digital scene matching and area co-relation (DSMAC) techniques to achieve accuracy described as "pin-point". The new launch vehicle, a MAZ transporter erector launcher, is armed with three missile rounds launched vertically.

In 2007 the Hatf VIII Ra'ad, an air-launched cruise missile (ALCM) was revealed in a test by the Pakistan Air Force. It has a stated range of 350 km. A flight test on 31 May 2012 was stated to have validated integration with the new Strategic Command and Control Support System (SCCSS), stated to be capable of remotely monitoring the missile's flight path in real time. It can avoid radar detection due to its low altitude trajectory.

See also
 List of missiles of Pakistan

References

1987 in Pakistan
Missile defense
Military projects of Pakistan
Secret military programs
Nuclear weapons programme of Pakistan
History of science and technology in Pakistan
Research and development in Pakistan
Pakistani military exercises
Nuclear history of Pakistan
Research projects